The Tumbler was John Martyn's second album released on Island Records in 1968.  The album shows a progression from his previous solo folk offering to a more expansive sound including significant contributions from jazz flautist Harold McNair.

Track listing
All tracks composed by John Martyn except where indicated.

"Sing a Song of Summer" – 2:22
"The River" – 2:59
"Goin' Down to Memphis" – 3:12
"The Gardeners" (Bill Lyons) – 3:15
"A Day at the Sea" – 2:35
"Fishin' Blues" (Henry Thomas) – 2:37
"Dusty" – 3:07
"Hello Train" – 2:36
"Winding Boy" (Jelly Roll Morton) – 2:22
"Fly on Home"  (Martyn, Paul Wheeler) – 2:33
"Knuckledy Crunch and Slippledee-slee Song" – 2:55
"Seven Black Roses" – 4:02

Personnel
John Martyn – vocals, guitar, harmonica, keyboards
Harold McNair – flute on "Dusty", "The Gardeners" and "Fly On Home"
David Moses – double bass
Paul Wheeler – guitar
Technical
Francine Winham - photography

References

External links
The Official John Martyn Website

John Martyn albums
1968 albums
Island Records albums